Temiang–Pantai Highway ( / Jalan Pintas Temiang) or Malaysia Federal Route 366 is a federal route in Seremban, Negeri Sembilan, Malaysia. It is built to shorten amount of time for users from Kajang–Seremban Highway to Malaysia Federal Route 86 which connects Seremban to Kuala Klawang and Simpang Pertang.

Route description and Overview 
The kilometre zero of this road is located at Temiang, at its interchange with  Kajang-Seremban Expressway at the Ulu Temiang Interchange. The road has four lanes, dual carriageway from Ulu Temiang Interchange until Temiang roundabout and two lanes, single carriageway (super two) for the rest of the road until Pantai junction.

History

Construction and cost 
The construction of the road began in 2019 and was completed on 23 July 2021, 17 days earlier than its expected completion. The road was opened to traffic on 26 August 2021. Construction of the road costs about RM180 million.

Scenic view along road 

The road is known for its scenic view of the Titiwangsa Mountains, the longest mountain range in Malaysia. Locals describe it having a "New Zealand-esque view".

Features 

 At most sections, the Federal Route 366 was built under the JKR R5 road standard, allowing maximum speed limit of up to 90 km/h. (Super two road)
 Wide roadside medians and emergency lanes
 2 roundabouts, one at-grade and another one is below elevated main route
 Scenic view of the Titiwangsa Mountains along the road

Controversy 
On January of 2022, a car group posted a picture of their gathering which the cars are parked along the roads emergency lane. This results in mixed reactions from people as the road was usually full of cars stopping on the roadside and emergency lanes which is very hazardous.

Starting from February of 2022, the road will be constantly patrolled by Seremban police and JPJ that will not allow and issue fines to any vehicle that stop along the road except for emergencies.

Plans to build a rest stop/vista point for road users to stop by safely are still in the works.

On 22 May 2022, a Malaysian artiste, Baby Shima made a TikTok video at the emergency lane which is against the Malaysian road laws. 

The Director of Department of Road Transport (JPJ) in the state of Negri Sembilan, Hanif Yusabra Yusof said, the action of a driver who stops in the emergency lane of the roadway without reasonable excuse is an offense.

However, people who want to take pictures on the road is not an offence if they do not park on the  shoulder of the road and emergency lanes for the purpose of taking pictures and gathering.

List of junctions

See also 

 Kajang–Seremban Highway
 Malaysia Federal Route 86
 Seremban

References 

Malaysian Federal Roads
Highways in Malaysia